Ladislas Kikunda Bushiri (born January 1, 1986 in Goma, Zaire) is a Congolese-Canadian soccer player.

Career
Bushiri signed for USL Professional Division club Los Angeles Blues on March 21, 2012.

References

External links

1986 births
Sportspeople from Goma
Democratic Republic of the Congo emigrants to Canada
Democratic Republic of the Congo footballers
Canadian soccer players
Canadian expatriate soccer players
Canadian expatriate sportspeople in Indonesia
Expatriate footballers in Indonesia
Living people
Persitara Jakarta Utara players
Liga 1 (Indonesia) players
VfL Wolfsburg players
Arminia Bielefeld players
Ottawa Fury (2005–2013) players
Orange County SC players
USL League Two players
USL Championship players
Black Canadian soccer players
Association football defenders
Association football midfielders
Canadian expatriate sportspeople in Germany
Canadian expatriate sportspeople in the United States
Democratic Republic of the Congo expatriate sportspeople in Germany
Democratic Republic of the Congo expatriate sportspeople in Indonesia
Democratic Republic of the Congo expatriate sportspeople in the United States